Viscount station is the northerly terminus of the Link Train automated people mover serving Toronto Pearson International Airport in Mississauga, Ontario, Canada. It is located on the south side of Viscount Road, between American Drive and Highway 409.

The station is an elevated structure with a single island platform built beside the employee parking lot, long term discount multi-storey parking garage, reduced rate parking lots and the ALT Hotel. There are bus connections to MiWay Routes 24 and 107.

This station is located near a future transit hub proposed by the GTAA and Metrolinx with connections to Line 5 Eglinton, Line 6 Finch West, GO Regional Express Rail, the Mississauga Transitway and many more local and regional bus connections.
Based on renderings, building this hub may involve the removal of the Link Train but this is subject to change.

References

External links

Toronto Pearson International Airport
Airport railway stations in Canada
Railway stations in Mississauga
Railway stations in Canada opened in 2006
2006 establishments in Ontario